"Capo" is a single by American rapper NLE Choppa, released on March 22, 2019. It was produced by Midas800.

Background and composition
NLE Choppa recorded the song at One Sound Studio in South Memphis, Memphis, Tennessee. Producer Midas800, who previously produced Choppa's hit single "Shotta Flow", sent him the beat, which is piano-based. Choppa wrote most of the song, including the hook. Beginning from the line "Before you try rob, hit your knees and pray to Buddha", the rest of the song was a freestyle. He did a melodic approach to the song as he wanted to use a different style.

Critical reception
Alex Zidel of HotNewHipHop gave the song a "Hottttt" rating and wrote, "Choppa seems to have his head screwed on straight, adding comical elements to his lyrics and promising that he'll never sell out for some quick money."

Charts

References

2019 singles
2019 songs
NLE Choppa songs
Songs written by NLE Choppa